Rudy Sims (born October 25, 1946) is a retired Canadian football player who played for the Ottawa Rough Riders, Toronto Argonauts and Hamilton Tiger-Cats. He played college football at Florida A&M University.

References

1946 births
Living people
American players of Canadian football
Ottawa Rough Riders players
Toronto Argonauts players
Hamilton Tiger-Cats players
Florida A&M Rattlers football players